John Due House or Henry Warfield House, is a historic slave plantation located in Clarksville in Howard County, Maryland, United States.

The Stone house resides at 6044 Trotter Road, a road named after Emma and John Trotter who owned the property in the 1930s. The 18th century kitchen predates the 1836 additions. The property includes a slave quarters, corn crib and smokehouse. It was built for Benjamin Franklin Warfield with his nephew Nicholas Warfield. By the 1960s the property was subdivided down to 29.47 acres. John L Due performed a restoration with a recommendation that the property should be added to the National Register.

See also
Clifton (Clarksville, Maryland)

References

Houses in Howard County, Maryland
Clarksville, Maryland
Plantation houses in Maryland
Slave cabins and quarters in the United States